Dianella is a genus of about forty species of flowering plants in the monocot family Asphodelaceae, commonly known as flax lilies. Plants in this genus are tufted herbs with more or less linear leaves and bisexual flowers with three sepals more or less similar to three petals and a superior ovary, the fruit a berry. They occur in Africa, South-east Asia, the Pacific Islands, New Zealand and Australia.

Several species of this genus, or the whole genus, are sometimes referred to by the common name blue flax lily, particularly in Australia.

Description
Plants in the genus Dianella are tufted perennial, rhizomatous herbs with fibrous or fleshy roots, more or less linear leaves with their bases overlapping, bisexual flowers with three sepals more or less similar to three blue, purple or white petals and a superior ovary, and the fruit a berry.

Taxonomy
The name Dianella was first formally published by Jean-Baptiste Lamarck in 1786 in his Encyclopédie Méthodique, but this did not validly establish the name because Lamarck did not include a description of the new genus.  Antoine Laurent de Jussieu made it a correct name in 1789 when he published a description in the first edition of his Genera Plantarum. The name Dianella is a reference to the Roman goddess Diana with the suffix ella meaning "small".

The genus Dianella is closely related to Thelionema and Herpolirion.

Distribution and habitat
Plants in the genus Dianella occur in Africa, South-east Asia, the Pacific Islands including Hawaii, New Zealand and Australia. About half of the species are native to Australia.

Species list
The following is a list of Dianella species accepted by the World Checklist of Selected Plant Families as at October 2020:

 Dianella acutifolia Schlittler - New Caledonia
 Dianella adenanthera (G.Forst.) R.J.F.Hend. - numerous Pacific Islands
 Dianella amoena G.W.Carr & P.F.Horsfall - Tasmania, Victoria
 Dianella atraxis R.J.F.Hend. - Queensland
 Dianella bambusifolia Hallier f. - Queensland, New Guinea
 Dianella brevicaulis (Ostenf.) G.W.Carr & P.F.Horsfall - southern Australia
 Dianella brevipedunculata R.J.F.Hend. - Queensland
 Dianella caerulea Sims - New Guinea, eastern Australia
 Dianella caerulea var. aquilonia R.J.F.Hend. 
 Dianella caerulea var. assera R.J.F.Hend.
 Dianella caerulea Sims var. caerulea
 Dianella caerulea var. cinerascans R.J.F.Hend.
 Dianella caerulea var. petasmatodes R.J.F.Hend.
 Dianella caerulea var. producta R.J.F.Hend.
 Dianella caerulea var. protensa R.J.F.Hend.
 Dianella caerulea var. vannata R.J.F.Hend.
 Dianella callicarpa G.W.Carr & P.F.Horsfall - Victoria
 Dianella carolinensis Lauterb. - Micronesia
 Dianella congesta R.Br. - Queensland, New South Wales
 Dianella crinoides R.J.F.Hend. - Queensland, New South Wales
 Dianella daenikeri Schlittler - New Caledonia
 Dianella dentata Schlittler - southeastern China
 Dianella ensifolia (L.) DC. (syn. D. ensata) Chimanimani Mountains of southern Africa; Indian Subcontinent, China, Madagascar, Southeast Asia, New Guinea, Solomon Islands, Japan, islands in Indian Ocean
 Dianella fruticans R.J.F.Hend. - Queensland
 Dianella haematica Heenan & de Lange - North Island of New Zealand
 Dianella incollata R.J.F.Hend. - Queensland
 Dianella intermedia Endl. - Norfolk Island of Australia
 Dianella javanica (Blume) Kunth - Southeast Asia, Papuasia
 Dianella latissima Heenan & de Lange - North Island of New Zealand
 Dianella longifolia R.Br. - widespread in Australia
 Dianella longifolia var. fragrans R.J.F.Hend.
 Dianella longifolia var. grandis R.J.F.Hend.
 Dianella longifolia R.Br. var. longifolia
 Dianella longifolia var. stenophylla Domin
 Dianella longifolia var. stupata R.J.F.Hend.
 Dianella longifolia var. surculosa R.J.F.Hend.
 Dianella monophylla Hallier f. - New Guinea
 Dianella nervosa R.J.F.Hend. - Queensland, New South Wales
 Dianella nigra Colenso - North + South Islands of New Zealand
 Dianella odorata Blume - Maluku, Sulawesi, Sumatra, Queensland, Northern Territory
 Dianella pavopennacea R.J.F.Hend. - Queensland
 Dianella pavopennacea var. major R.J.F.Hend.
 Dianella pavopennacea R.J.F.Hend. var. pavopennacea
 Dianella pavopennacea var. robusta R.J.F.Hend.
 Dianella pendula Schlittler - îles Loyauté of New Caledonia
 Dianella plicata Schlittler - New Caledonia
 Dianella porracea (R.J.F.Hend.) Horsfall & G.W.Carr - Queensland, New South Wales, South Australia
 Dianella prunina R.J.F.Hend. - New South Wales
 Dianella rara R.Br. - Queensland
 Dianella revoluta R.Br. - widespread in Australia
 Dianella revoluta var. divaricata R.J.F.Hend.
 Dianella revoluta var. minor R.J.F.Hend.
 Dianella revoluta (R.Br.) R.J.F.Hend.var. revoluta
 Dianella revoluta var. tenuis R.J.F.Hend.
 Dianella revoluta var. vinosa R.J.F.Hend.
 Dianella saffordiana Fosberg & Sachet - Guam
 Dianella sandwicensis Hook. & Arn. - New Caledonia, Hawaiian Islands, Marquesas
 Dianella serrulata Hallier f. - Queensland, New Guinea
 Dianella stipitata Schlittler - New Caledonia
 Dianella tarda Horsfall & G.W.Carr - New South Wales, Victoria
 Dianella tasmanica Hook.f. - Tasmania, Victoria, New South Wales
 Dianella tenuissima G.W.Carr - New South Wales

Uses
Several species of Dianella are grown for their attractive foliage and shiny, blue to purple berries. 

Reports of the edibility of the fruit range from very poisonous to sweet and nutty (such as D. caerulea), and the beach flax lily (D. congesta) is reportedly the best-tasting.

The leaves are used to weave dillies and baskets by Indigenous Australians.

See also
 List of plants known as lily

References

External links

 Australian plants online

Asphodelaceae genera